In Tune We Trust is the second extended play (EP) by American rapper Lil Wayne. It was released on July 5, 2017, under Young Money Entertainment. The four songs on the EP were recorded by Lil Wayne during his ongoing feud with Cash Money Records. Lil Wayne stated that he would give his fans new material before Tha Carter V is finally released. Lil Wayne decided to put the EP on the streaming services DatPiff and SoundCloud. A music video for the track "Loyalty" was released on the WorldStarHipHop YouTube page. The EP features a freestyle over rapper Playboi Carti's breakout hit "Magnolia".

Track listing

References 

2017 EPs
Albums produced by Mike Will Made It
Lil Wayne albums